Dharapuram taluk is a taluk in Tirupur district of the Indian state of Tamil Nadu. The headquarters is the town of Dharapuram. Dharapuram taluk previously included what is now Kangeyam taluk.

Demographics
According to the 2011 census, the taluk of Dharapuram had a population of 282,889 with 140,874  males and 142,015 females. There were 1008 women for every 1000 men. The taluk had a literacy rate of 67.11. Child population in the age group below 6 was 10,215 Males and 9,510 Females.

Panchayat Unions 
Panchayat Union Blocks Comes Under Dharapuram Taluk are:
[[Dharapura
m block]]
Mulanur block
Kundadam block (also part of Kangeyam taluk)

References 

Taluks of Tiruppur district